Mingos & Os Samurais (sometimes spelled Mingos e os Samurais) is the fifth studio album by Portuguese musician Rui Veloso, released on 7 August 1990 by EMI-Valentim de Carvalho. It is a concept album that tells the story of a small suburban band during the 1960s and the 1970s.

It is Veloso's most commercially successful album and one of the best-selling albums of all time in Portugal. The album reached number one in the Portuguese album charts and was at the top for 24 weeks. It was certified 7× platinum by the AFP and sold 280,000 copies by early 1992, which was at that time a sales record for a Portuguese artist. The singles "Não Há Estrelas no Céu" and "A Paixão (Segundo Nicolau da Viola)" were very successful as well.

History
The idea for the album was formed in 1982. After the financial independence achieved from his self-titled 1986 album, Veloso got the means to record a double-album about the life of a small suburban band in the 1960s and the 1970s.

"Não Há Estrelas no Céu" was the last song recorded for the album.

Commercial performance 
Mingos & Os Samurais was hugely successful in Portugal. It reached number one in the Portuguese album charts two weeks after its release and was number-one for a total of 24 weeks. It was certified 7× platinum by the AFP and sold 280,000 copies by early 1992.

Legacy 
In 2009, Mingos & Os Samurais was ranked the 4th greatest Portuguese album of the 1990s by Portuguese music magazine Blitz.

Track listing
All tracks are written by Carlos Tê and Rui Veloso.

Disc 1Disc 2

Charts

Certifications and sales

References

External links
Rui Veloso at Rate Your Music
Mingos e Os Samurais at moo.pt 

1990 albums
Rui Veloso albums